Pavlovsk is a town and the administrative center of Pavlovsky District in Voronezh Oblast, Russia, located on the left bank of the Don River at its confluence with the Osered),  southeast of Voronezh, the administrative center of the oblast. Population:

History
In 1709, Peter the Great moved the ship docks from Voronezh to the new location and started the construction of a new fortress, which at different times was called Sereda, Osered, and Oseredskaya. In 1711, a garrison was moved here from the St. Paul Fortress on the Sea of Azov, and the fortress was renamed Pavlovskaya (sometimes called Novopavlovskaya), and the town around it—Pavlovsk.

By the end of the 18th century the town lost its importance and went into decline.

Gallery

Administrative and municipal status
Within the framework of administrative divisions, Pavlovsk serves as the administrative center of Pavlovsky District. As an administrative division, it is incorporated within Pavlovsky District as Pavlovsk Urban Settlement. As a municipal division, this administrative unit also has urban settlement status and is a part of Pavlovsky Municipal District.

References

Notes

Sources

Cities and towns in Voronezh Oblast
Pavlovsky Uyezd, Voronezh Governorate